Ambajhari Ordnance Factory Ground is a ground in campus of Ambajhari Ordnance Factory in Nagpur, Vidarbha. The ground has hosted non-first-class matches from 1980 to 2002 and since then the ground is not used. In 1980, the ground has hosted a first-class match when Vidarbha cricket team and Uttar Pradesh cricket team in Ranji Trophy.

References

External links
 ESPNcricinfo
 CricketArchive
 Maharashtra Online

Cricket grounds in Maharashtra
Multi-purpose stadiums in India
Sports venues in Nagpur
Defunct cricket grounds in India
1980 establishments in Maharashtra
Sports venues completed in 1980
20th-century architecture in India